William Webster may refer to:

Sportsmen
William Webster (baseball) (1896–?), American Negro leagues baseball player
William Webster (cricketer, born 1876) (1876–1948), Scottish cricketer
William Webster (cricketer, born 1880) (1880–1931), English cricketer
William Webster (cricketer, born 1910) (1910–1986), English cricketer, footballer, stockbroker and administrator
Billy Webster (1909–?), English soccer player
Bill Webster (American football) (1903–1981), American football player

Law and politics
William L. Webster (born 1953), former Missouri state representative and attorney general
William Webster (Australian politician) (1860–1936), Australian politician
William Maule McDowell Webster (1885–1958), Australian trade unionist and NSW Labor Party president
William H. Webster (born 1924), American judge, FBI director and CIA director
William Bennett Webster (1798–1861), doctor, amateur geologist and political figure in Nova Scotia, Canada
William Gourlay Webster (1884–1965), civil engineer, surveyor and politician in Ontario, Canada

Others
William Webster (theologian) (1689–1758), British clergyman
W. D. Webster (William Downing Webster, 1868–1913), British dealer in ethnographic art
William Webster (engineer), American engineer, recipient of the John Fritz Medal
William Webster (builder) (1819–1888), English builder
William Webster (chemical engineer) (1855–1910), son of English builder, scientist involved in development of x-rays
William Webster (dean of Aberdeen and Orkney) (died 1896)
William G. Webster (born 1951), United States Army officer
William Henry Webster (1850–1931), priest and malacologist in New Zealand
Bill Webster, a fictional character from the British soap opera Coronation Street